Chasing Shadows is the third EP by alternative rock band Angels & Airwaves, released on April 8, 2016, through To the Stars. Similar to the ...Of Nightmares EP, Chasing Shadows is a companion piece to the first book in the Sekret Machines series, co-written by Tom DeLonge and A. J. Hartley. Along with the EP is a planned documentary series. It was the second EP released by the band following DeLonge's exit from Blink-182.

Background
The Sekret Machines project is about "Unidentified Aerial Phenomena". The project blends sources from the "military and intelligence community" with a "story about people across the world and history who have seen something impossible lighting up the night sky." DeLonge described the novel as the "outcome of many secret meetings across the United States with government officials" and compared the music to the band's earlier material.

The sound of the EP steps away from the more electronic elements of the band into more guitar-driven rock, leading many to compare the songs to the sound of DeLonge's previous band Blink-182. The band live debuted the track "Overload" at the first show of their comeback tour in 2019 at Solana Beach alongside debut performances of many tracks from the band's previous album The Dream Walker.

Track listing

Personnel
Credits adapted from Discogs.

Angels & Airwaves
 Tom DeLonge – lead vocals, guitar, synths, bass guitar, producer
 Ilan Rubin – drums

Additional personnel
 Aaron Rubin – producer, mixing, engineering
 Tom Baker – mastering

Charts

References

2016 EPs
Angels & Airwaves albums
Alternative rock EPs